A cruise missile is a guided missile used against terrestrial or naval targets that remains in the atmosphere and flies the major portion of its flight path at approximately constant speed. Cruise missiles are designed to deliver a large warhead over long distances with high precision. Modern cruise missiles are capable of travelling at high subsonic, supersonic, or hypersonic speeds, are self-navigating, and are able to fly on a non-ballistic, extremely low-altitude trajectory.

History

The idea of an "aerial torpedo" was shown in the British 1909 film The Airship Destroyer in which flying torpedoes controlled wirelessly are used to bring down airships bombing London.

In 1916, the American aviator Lawrence Sperry built and patented an "aerial torpedo", the Hewitt-Sperry Automatic Airplane, a small biplane carrying a TNT charge, a Sperry autopilot and a barometric altitude control. Inspired by the experiments, the United States Army developed a similar flying bomb called the Kettering Bug. Germany had also flown trials with remote-controlled aerial gliders (Torpedogleiter) built by Siemens-Schuckert beginning in 1916.

In the Interwar Period, Britain's Royal Aircraft Establishment developed the Larynx (Long Range Gun with Lynx Engine), which underwent a few flight tests in the 1920s.

In the Soviet Union, Sergei Korolev headed the GIRD-06 cruise missile project from 1932 to 1939, which used a rocket-powered boost-glide bomb design. The 06/III (RP-216) and 06/IV (RP-212) contained gyroscopic guidance systems. The vehicle was designed to boost to 28 km altitude and glide a distance of 280 km, but test flights in 1934 and 1936 only reached an altitude of 500 meters.

In 1944, during World War II, Germany deployed the first operational cruise missiles. The V-1, often called a flying bomb, contained a gyroscope guidance system and was propelled by a simple pulsejet engine, the sound of which gave it the nickname of "buzz bomb" or "doodlebug". Accuracy was sufficient only for use against very large targets (the general area of a city), while the range of 250 km was significantly lower than that of a bomber carrying the same payload. The main advantages were speed (although not sufficient to outperform contemporary propeller-driven interceptors) and expendability. The production cost of a V-1 was only a small fraction of that of a V-2 supersonic ballistic missile with a similar-sized warhead. Unlike the V-2, the initial deployments of the V-1 required stationary launch ramps which were susceptible to bombardment. Nazi Germany, in 1943, also developed the Mistel composite aircraft program, which can be seen as a rudimentary air-launched cruise missile, where a piloted fighter-type aircraft was mounted atop an unpiloted bomber-sized aircraft that was packed with explosives to be released while approaching the target. Bomber-launched variants of the V-1 saw limited operational service near the end of the war, with the pioneering V-1's design reverse-engineered by the Americans as the Republic-Ford JB-2 cruise missile.

Immediately after the war, the United States Air Force had 21 different guided missile projects, including would-be cruise missiles. All but four were cancelled by 1948: the Air Materiel Command Banshee, the SM-62 Snark, the SM-64 Navaho, and the MGM-1 Matador. The Banshee design was similar to Operation Aphrodite; like Aphrodite, it failed, and was cancelled in April 1949. Concurrently, the US Navy's Operation Bumblebee, was conducted at Topsail Island, North Carolina, from c. 1 June 1946, to 28 July 1948. Bumblebee produced proof-of-concept technologies that influenced the US military's other missile projects.

During the Cold War, both the United States and the Soviet Union experimented further with the concept, deploying early cruise missiles from land, submarines and aircraft. The main outcome of the United States Navy submarine missile project was the SSM-N-8 Regulus missile, based upon the V-1.

The United States Air Force's first operational surface-to-surface missile was the winged, mobile, nuclear-capable MGM-1 Matador, also similar in concept to the V-1. Deployment overseas began in 1954, first to West Germany and later to the Republic of China and South Korea. On 7 November 1956, the U.S. Air Force deployed Matador units in West Germany, whose missiles were capable of striking targets in the Warsaw Pact, from their fixed day-to-day sites to unannounced dispersed launch locations. This alert was in response to the crisis posed by the Soviet attack on Hungary which suppressed the Hungarian Revolution of 1956.

Between 1957 and 1961 the United States followed an ambitious and well-funded program to develop a nuclear-powered cruise missile, Supersonic Low Altitude Missile (SLAM). It was designed to fly below the enemy's radar at speeds above Mach 3 and carry hydrogen bombs that it would drop along its path over enemy territory. Although the concept was proven sound and the 500 megawatt engine finished a successful test run in 1961, no airworthy device was ever completed. The project was finally abandoned in favor of ICBM development.

While ballistic missiles were the preferred weapons for land targets, heavy nuclear and conventional weapon tipped cruise missiles were seen by the USSR as a primary weapon to destroy United States naval carrier battle groups. Large submarines (for example, Echo and Oscar classes) were developed to carry these weapons and shadow United States battle groups at sea, and large bombers (for example, Backfire, Bear, and Blackjack models) were equipped with the weapons in their air-launched cruise missile (ALCM) configuration.

General design

Cruise missiles generally consist of a guidance system, payload, and aircraft propulsion system, housed in an airframe with small wings and empennage for flight control. Payloads usually consist of a conventional warhead or a nuclear warhead. Cruise missiles tend to be propelled by jet engine, with turbofan engines in particular being preferred due to their greater efficiency at low altitude and subsonic speed.

Guidance systems

Guidance systems also vary greatly. Low-cost systems use a radar altimeter, barometric altimeter and clock to navigate a digital strip map. More advanced systems use inertial guidance, satellite guidance and terrain contour matching (TERCOM). Use of an automatic target recognition (ATR) algorithm/device in the guidance system increases accuracy of the missile. The Standoff Land Attack Missile features an ATR unit from General Electric.

Categories
Cruise missiles can be categorized by size, speed (subsonic or supersonic), range, and whether launched from land, air, surface ship, or submarine. Often versions of the same missile are produced for different launch platforms; sometimes air- and submarine-launched versions are a little lighter and smaller than land- and ship-launched versions.

Guidance systems can vary across missiles. Some missiles can be fitted with any of a variety of navigation systems (Inertial navigation, TERCOM, or satellite navigation). Larger cruise missiles can carry either a conventional or a nuclear warhead, while smaller ones carry only conventional warheads.

Hypersonic

A hypersonic cruise missile travels at least five times the speed of sound (Mach 5).

14-X , a scramjet engine currently under development by Brazil.
3M22 Zircon (>1000–1500 km)  hypersonic anti-ship cruise missile.
ASN4G (Air-Sol Nucléaire de 4e Génération) , a scramjet-powered hypersonic cruise missile being developed by France
BrahMos-II (≈800–1000 km) /, a hypersonic missile  under development  in India and Russia.
FC/ASW (300 km)  (under development) – Franco-British stealth hypersonic cruise missile concept.
HTDV  - hypersonic scramjet demonstration a carrier vehicle for hypersonic and long-range cruise missiles is being developed by Defence Research and Development Organisation (DRDO).
Hyfly-2  - air-launched hypersonic cruise missile first displayed at Sea Air Space 2021, developed by Boeing
Hypersonic Air-breathing Weapon Concept (HAWC, pronounced Hawk)  - scramjet powered air-launched hypersonic cruise missile without a warhead and use its own kinetic energy upon impact to destroy the target, developed by DARPA
Kh-90 (3,000–4,000 km) / - a hypersonic air-to-surface cruise missile developed in 1990 by the USSR and later by Russia. This missile was designed to cruise from Mach 4 to Mach 6, eventually being able to travel at speeds lower than Mach 10–15. But this cruise-missile system did not enter service.
Hypersonic Attack Cruise Missile (HACM)   planned for use by the United States Air Force.
SCIFiRE / - Southern Cross Integrated Flight Research Experiment (SCIFiRE) is a joint program between the US Department of Defense and the Australian Department of Defence for a Mach 5 scramjet powered missile. In September 2021, the US Department of Defense awarded Preliminary Design Review contracts to Boeing, Lockheed Martin and Raytheon Missiles & Defense.

Supersonic

These missiles travel faster than the speed of sound, usually using ramjet engines. The range is typically 100–500 km, but can be greater. Guidance systems vary.

Examples:
3M-54 Kalibr (up to 4,500 km)  Russia (the "Sizzler" variant is capable of supersonic speed at the terminal stage only)
3M-51 Alfa (250 km)  
Kh-15 (300 km)  
AGM-69 SRAM (200 km)  United States
Air-Sol Moyenne Portée (300–500 km+)  France – supersonic stand-off nuclear missile
 South Korea new AShM  similar to Brahmos, ramjet
BrahMos (block-I 290 km, Block-II 500 & Block-IIA 600 km) / India / Russia – fastest supersonic cruise missile (3.2 mach) and the only one to complete the tactical cruise missile triad
 ASM-3 (150-200,E-400)  Japan JASDF

 Blyskavka  Artem Luch Pivdenmash 100 – 370 km
Hsiung Feng III (400 km)  Taiwan
Yun Feng (~2,000 km)  Taiwan
KD-88  China
Kh-20 (380–600 km)   USSR
Kh-31 (25–110 km)  Russia
Kh-32 (600–1,000 km)  Russia

Kh-61 / USSR / Russia
Kh-80 (3,000–5,000 km) /
P-270 Moskit (120–250 km) / USSR / Russia
P-500 Bazalt (550 km) / USSR / Russia
P-700 Granit (625 km) / USSR / Russia
P-800 Oniks (600–800 km)  Russia
P-1000 Vulkan (800 km) / USSR / Russia
DF-100  China
C-101  China
C-301  China
C-803  China – supersonic terminal stage only
C-805  China
CX-1  China
YJ-12 (250–400 km)  China
YJ-18 (220–540 km)  China
YJ-91  China
SSM-N-9 Regulus II (1,852 km)  United States

Intercontinental-range supersonic

9M730 Burevestnik (Unlimited Range)  Russia
Burya (8,500 km)  USSR
MKR (8,000 km)  USSR
RSS-40 Buran (8,500 km)  USSR
SLAM (cancelled in 1964)  United States
SM-62 Snark (10,200 km)  United States
SM-64 Navaho (canceled in 1958)  United States

Long-range subsonic

The United States, Russia, North Korea, India, Iran, South Korea, Israel, France, China and Pakistan have developed several long-range subsonic cruise missiles. Earlier versions of these missiles used inertial navigation; later versions use much more accurate TERCOM and DSMAC systems. Most recent versions can use satellite navigation.

Examples:
3M-54 Kalibr (up to 4,500 km)  Russia
AGM-86 ALCM  United States
AGM-129 ACM  United States
AGM-181 LRSOUnited States
BGM-109 Tomahawk (up to 1,700 km)  United States
BGM-109G Ground Launched Cruise Missile (2,500 km)  
Kh-55 (3,000 km) and Kh-65  Russia
Kh-101 (4500–5500 km)  Russia
 Iskander-K  not less than 3 500 km
 Hwasal-2  North Korea > 2000 km
RK-55 (3,000 km)  Soviet Union
Nirbhay  India (up to 1500 km) 
Meshkat  Iran (Range 2000 km)
MdCN (>1,000 km)  France
Soumar Iran (Range allegedly 2,000–3,000 km)
Hoveyzeh (Cruise Missile)  Iran (Range 1,350 km)
Quds 1 Houthi 
Hsiung Feng IIE  Taiwan
Hyunmoo III  South Korea (Hyunmoo IIIA-500 km, Hyunmoo IIIB-1000 km, Hyunmoo IIIC-1500 km)
Type 12 SSM  Japan
MGM-13 Mace  United States
DF-10/CJ-10  China (CJ-10K - 1500 km, CJ-20 - 2000 km)
Popeye Turbo SLCM  Israel
GEZGİN (800-1,200 km)  Turkey

Medium-range subsonic

These missiles are about the same size and weight and fly at similar speeds to the above category. Guidance systems vary.

Examples:

Storm Shadow/SCALP (560 km) / France/UK
Taurus KEPD 350 (500+ km) // Germany / Sweden / Spain
Kh-50 (Kh-SD) and Kh-101 Kh-65 variants  Russia
P-5 Pyatyorka (450–750 km)   Russia,  North Korea
Raad  Iran (360 km)
Ya-Ali (700 km)  Iran
Hyunmoo-3 (within 1500 km)  South Korea
Babur-1  Pakistan (300 km) 
Babur-1 A  Pakistan (450 km) 
Babur-1 B  Pakistan (600+ km) 
Babur-2  Pakistan (650 km) 
Babur-3  Pakistan (450 km)
Ra'ad ALCM (350 km)  Pakistan
Ra'ad Mark-2 ALCM (400 km)  Pakistan
Zarb (320 km)  Pakistan
Harbah (250–450 km)  Pakistan
KD-63  China
SOM (SOM B Block I)  Turkey (350 km range under serial production, 500 km + range under development) – 500 km, 1500 km and 2500 km versions
AGM-158 JASSM (370–1900 km)  United States
AGM-158C LRASM (USA) (370 km+-560 km+)  United States
MGM-1 Matador (700 km)  United States
SSM-N-8 Regulus (926 km)  United States

Short-range subsonic

Examples:
Apache (100–140 km)  France
AVMT-300 (300 km)  Brazil
MICLA-BR (300 km)  Brazil 
Hyunmoo-3 (over 300 km) shorter range  South Korea
SSM-700K Haeseong (180+ km)  South Korea
Kh-35 (130–300 km)  Russia, KN-19 Ks3/4  North Korea
Kh-59 (115–550 km)  Russia
P-15 (40–80 km)  Russia, KN-1  North Korea
Nasr-1  Iran
Zafar (25 km)  Iran
Noor  Iran
Qader  Iran
paveh (1650 km)  Iran
Naval Strike Missile (185–555 km)  Norway
RBS-15  Sweden
Korshun  a locally derivative of Kh-55 and RK-55, made by Artem Luch Vizar (ZhMZ), KhAZ,  Yuzhnoe Pivdenmash, powered by an AI Progress Motor Sich MS-400 like Neptun missile and same builders designer.
Neptune  Ukraine
V-1 flying bomb (250 km)  Nazi Germany

Hsiung Feng II  Taiwan
Wan Chien  Taiwan
 VCM-01  Vietnam 100–300 km
 Aist  Belarus 100 200 – 300 km 
Marte ER 100+ km 
 Sea Killer export variant 
Otomat (180 km) / France / Italy
 Otomat Mk2 E / Teseo Mk2/E  360 km new turbofan
C-801 (40 km)  China
C-802 (120–230 km)  China
C-803  China
C-805  China
C-602  China
CM-602G  China
Delilah missile (250 km)  Israel
Gabriel IV (200 km)  Israel
Popeye turbo ALCM (78 km)  Israel
RGM-84 Harpoon (124–310 km)  United States
AGM-84E Standoff Land Attack Missile (110 km)  United States
AGM-84H/K SLAM-ER (270 km)  United States
Silkworm (100–500 km)  China
SOM  Turkey
Atmaca  Turkey
Çakır  Turkey

Deployment

The most common mission for cruise missiles is to attack relatively high-value targets such as ships, command bunkers, bridges and dams. Modern guidance systems permit accurate attacks.

, the BGM-109 Tomahawk missile model has become a significant part of the United States naval arsenal. It gives ships and submarines an extremely accurate, long-range, conventional land attack weapon. Each costs about US$1.99 million. Both the Tomahawk and the AGM-86 were used extensively during Operation Desert Storm. On 7 April 2017, during the Syrian Civil War, U.S. warships fired more than 50 cruise missiles into a Syrian air base in retaliation for a Syrian Sarin gas attack against a rebel stronghold.

The United States Air Force (USAF) deploys an air-launched cruise missile, the AGM-86 ALCM. The Boeing B-52 Stratofortress is the exclusive delivery vehicle for the AGM-86 and AGM-129 ACM. Both missile types are configurable for either conventional or nuclear warheads.

The USAF adopted the AGM-86 for its bomber fleet while AGM-109 was adapted to launch from trucks and ships and adopted by the USAF and Navy. The truck-launched versions, and also the Pershing II and SS-20 Intermediate Range Ballistic Missiles, were later destroyed under the bilateral INF (Intermediate Range Nuclear Forces) treaty with the USSR.

The British Royal Navy (RN) also operates cruise missiles, specifically the U.S.-made Tomahawk, used by the RN's nuclear submarine fleet. UK conventional warhead versions were first fired in combat by the RN in 1999, during the Kosovo War (the United States fired cruise missiles in 1991). The Royal Air Force uses the Storm Shadow cruise missile on its Typhoon and previously its Tornado GR4 aircraft. It is also used by France, where it is known as SCALP EG, and carried by the Armée de l'Air's Mirage 2000 and Rafale aircraft.

India and Russia have jointly developed the supersonic cruise missile BrahMos. There are three versions of the Brahmos: ship/land-launched, air-launched and sub-launched. The ship/land-launched version were operational as of late 2007. The Brahmos has the capability to attack targets on land. Russia also continues to operate other cruise missiles: the SS-N-12 Sandbox, SS-N-19 Shipwreck, SS-N-22 Sunburn and SS-N-25 Switchblade. Germany and Spain operate the Taurus missile while Pakistan has made the Babur missile Both the People's Republic of China and the Republic of China (Taiwan) have designed several cruise missile variants, such as the well-known C-802, some of which are capable of carrying biological, chemical, nuclear, and conventional warheads.

Nuclear warhead versions

China

China has CJ-10 land attack cruise missile which is capable of carrying a nuclear warhead. Additionally, China appears to have tested a hypersonic cruise missile in August 2021, a claim it denies.

France

The French Force de Frappe nuclear forces include both land and sea-based bombers with Air-Sol Moyenne Portée (ASMP) high speed medium range nuclear cruise missiles. Two models are in use, ASMP and a newer ASMP-Ameliorer Plus (ASMP-A), which was developed in 1999. An estimated 40 to 50 were produced.

India

India in 2017 successfully flight-tested its indigenous Nirbhay ('Fearless') land-attack cruise missile, which can deliver nuclear warheads to a strike range of 1,000-km. Nirbhay had been flight-tested successfully.

Israel

The Israel Defense Forces reportedly deploy the medium-range air-launched Popeye Turbo ALCM and the Popeye Turbo SLCM medium-long range cruise missile with nuclear warheads on Dolphin class submarines.

Pakistan

Pakistan currently has four cruise missile systems: the air-launched Ra'ad and its enhanced version Ra'ad II; the ground and underwater launched Babur; ship-launched Harbah missile and surface launched Zarb missile. Babur has been in service with the Pakistan Army since 2010.

Russia

Russia has Kh-55SM cruise missiles, with a range similar to the United States' AGM-129 range of 3000 km, but are able to carry a more powerful warhead of 200 kt. They are equipped with a TERCOM system which allows them to cruise at an altitude lower than 110 meters at subsonic speeds while obtaining a CEP accuracy of 15 meters with an inertial navigation system. They are air-launched from either Tupolev Tu-95s, Tupolev Tu-22Ms, or Tupolev Tu-160s, each able to carry 16 for the Tu-95, 12 for the Tu-160, and 4 for the Tu-22M. A stealth version of the missile, the Kh-101 is in development. It has similar qualities as the Kh-55, except that its range has been extended to 5,000 km, equipped with a 1,000 kg conventional warhead, and has stealth features which reduces its probability of intercept.

After the collapse of the Soviet Union, the most recent cruise missile developed was the Kalibr missile which entered production in the early 1990s and officially inducted into the Russian arsenal in 1994. However, it only saw its combat debut on 7 October 2015, in Syria as a part of the Russian military campaign in Syria. The missile has been used 14 more times in combat operations in Syria since its debut.

In the late 1950s and early 1960s, the Soviet Union was attempting to develop cruise missiles. In this short time frame, the Soviet Union was working on nearly ten different types of cruise missiles. However, due to resources, most of the initial types of cruise missiles developed by the Soviet Union were Sea-Launched Cruise Missiles or Submarine-Launched Cruise Missiles (SLCMs). The SS-N-1 cruise missile was developed to have different configurations to be fired from a submarine or a ship. However, as the time progressed, the Soviet Union began to work on air launched cruise missiles as well (ALCM). These ACLM missiles were typically delivered via bombers designated as "Blinders" or "Backfire". The missiles in this configuration were called the AS-1, and AS-2 with eventual new variants with more development time. The main purpose of Soviet-based cruise missiles was to have defense and offensive mechanisms against enemy ships; in other words most of the Soviet cruise missiles were anti-ship missiles. the 1980s the Soviet Union had developed an arsenal of cruise missiles nearing 600 platforms which consisted of land, sea, and air delivery systems.

United States

The United States has deployed nine nuclear cruise missiles at one time or another.
MGM-1 Matador ground-launched missile, out of service
MGM-13 Mace ground-launched missile, out of service
SSM-N-8 Regulus submarine-launched missile, out of service
SM-62 Snark ground-launched missile, out of service
AGM-28 Hound Dog air-launched missile, out of service
BGM-109G Ground Launched Cruise Missile, out of service
AGM-86 ALCM air-launched cruise missile, 350 to 550 missiles and W80 warheads still in service
BGM-109 Tomahawk cruise missile in nuclear submarine-, surface ship-, and ground-launched models, nuclear models out of service but warheads kept in reserve.
AGM-129 ACM air-launched missile, out of service

Efficiency in modern warfare
Currently cruise missiles are among the most expensive of single-use weapons, up to several million dollars apiece. One consequence of this is that its users face difficult choices in target allocation, to avoid expending the missiles on targets of low value. For instance, during the 2001 strikes on Afghanistan the United States attacked targets of very low monetary value with cruise missiles, which led many to question the efficiency of the weapon. However, proponents of the cruise missile counter that the weapon can not be blamed for poor target selection and the same argument applies to other types of UAVs: they are cheaper than human pilots when total training and infrastructure costs are taken into account, not to mention the risk of loss of personnel. As demonstrated in Libya in 2011 and prior conflicts, cruise missiles are much more difficult to detect and intercept than other aerial assets (reduced radar cross-section, infrared and visual signature due to smaller size), suiting them to attacks against static air defense systems.

See also
 Affordable Weapon System
 Cruise missile submarine
 Eugene Vielle (pioneer of technology that led to the Cruise missile)
 Expendable launch system
 List of cruise missiles
 List of rocket aircraft
 Lists of weapons
 Low Cost Miniature Cruise Missile
 NATO reporting name (has lists of various Soviet missiles)
 Weapon of mass destruction

References

https://uslivenic.com/3m22-zircon-missile-russias-fastest-missile/

External links

3M22 Zircon missile – Russia’s fastest missile.{{ Cruise Missile |Russia Cruise missile
The Cruise Missile: Precursors and Problems by Werrell, Kenneth P.*An introduction to cruise missiles  — From the website of the Federation of American Scientists (FAS)
Missile Threat: A Project of the Center for Strategic and International Studies

 
Missile types
Low flying